Preet Kaur Nayak is an Indian television actress. She worked in serials like Sabki Laadli Bebo, Ram Milaayi Jodi, Fear Files: Darr Ki Sacchi Tasvirein, Savdhaan India and  Chakravartin Ashoka Samrat as Queen Subrasi. Preet also worked in a film Yeh Jo Mohabbat Hai in 2012.

Filmography

Television
 Sabki Laadli Bebo as Geet Malhotra
 Ram Milaayi Jodi as Sweety
 Tum Dena Saath Mera as Riya Oberoi
 Fear Files: Darr Ki Sacchi Tasvirein
 Savdhaan India as Sujata
 Chakravartin Ashoka Samrat as Queen Subrasi
 Dil Deke Dekho as Simran Chopra
 Mayavi Maling as Queen Dharini
 Vikram Betaal Ki Rahasya Gatha as Renuka
  Muskaan as Tara
 Jag Janani Maa Vaishno Devi - Kahani Mata Rani Ki as Kadika
 Imlie as Rupali Tripathi

Films
 Yeh Jo Mohabbat Hai (2012)

References

External links

Living people
1983 births